Inigo Ross (6 August 1960 – 1997) was an Antigua and Barbuda windsurfer. He competed in the Windglider event at the 1984 Summer Olympics.

References

External links
 
 

1960 births
1997 deaths
Antigua and Barbuda windsurfers
Antigua and Barbuda male sailors (sport)
Olympic sailors of Antigua and Barbuda
Sailors at the 1984 Summer Olympics – Windglider
Place of birth missing